The 2021 Louisville City FC season was the club's seventh season of competition. City competed in the USL Championship, the second tier of soccer in the United States.

Background 

The previous season was significantly altered due to the COVID-19 pandemic. Louisville City played one match to start the USL Championship season on March 7, 2020, before the season was suspended on March 12, 2020. Louisville City resumed the season on July 12, 2020, under an abbreviated 16-game season instead of 32. Stadium capacity was capped at 4,900; or about 31% of stadium capacity, to enforce social distancing measures.

Louisville City FC finished the truncated 2020 season with a record of 11–2–3, which was good enough to finish in first in Group E, first in the eastern conference, and second overall in the league. City reached the Eastern Conference Final, or semifinals of the USL Championship Playoffs before losing to the Tampa Bay Rowdies.

Cameron Lancaster led Louisville in scoring with 10 goals across all competitions, good enough for the fifth highest goal scoring tally in the league. Lancaster, along with league Goalkeeper of the Year Ben Lundt, defender Sean Totsch, and midfielder Speedy Williams, were named to the All-League First Team.

Current squad

Competitions

Preseason friendlies

USL Championship

Louisville City entered the season coached by John Hackworth, who had been at the helm since August 2018. On April 27, 2021, it was announced that Hackworth and Louisville City had mutually terminated Hackworth's contract; Danny Cruz was named the interim head coach. On October 11, 2021, Cruz was named the permanent head coach.

Standings — Central Division

Results summary

Match results
For the 2021 USL Championship season, Louisville City was placed in the Central Division. The club played four matches against each divisional opponent (two home, two away), and four other matches against teams outside the division. Louisville City faced San Diego Loyal SC, Colorado Springs Switchbacks FC, and New Mexico United for the first time in their history. For the first time in their history, Louisville City completed a full-length regular season without a player being sent off, and without a multi-goal loss, accomplishments the team would sustain through the playoff run.

USL Cup Playoffs

The top four teams in each of the four USL Championship divisions advanced to the 2021 USL Championship Playoffs. Louisville City entered the playoffs as the top seed out of the Central Division, and second overall seed in the Eastern Conference.

U.S. Open Cup 

On March 29, 2021, the U.S. Soccer Federation announced a truncated format for the 2021 U.S. Open Cup. 16 clubs would participate, each entering at the same time in a Round of 16: 8 from MLS to be determined by league table position after three weeks of play; 4 from the USL Championship, specifically each conference finalist from the 2020 USL Championship Playoffs, including Louisville City; Greenville Triumph SC of USL League One; Detroit City FC of the NISA, and Open Division sides FC Golden State Force and Newtown Pride FC. All non-MLS sides would be drawn against an MLS side for the Round of 16. The competition would begin in May and conclude by the end of June.

On April 16, 2021, the U.S. Soccer Federation announced that the competition would not go forward in the spring as planned, and that it would evaluate holding the competition later in the year.

On July 20, 2021, in conjunction with announcing a tentative schedule for the 2022 U.S. Open Cup, the U.S. Soccer Federation also declared that the 2021 edition of the competition was officially cancelled.

Player statistics

Top scorers

Assist leaders

Clean sheets

Disciplinary 
The 2021 season was Louisville City's first full-length campaign without having a player sent off. However, the club accumulated more yellow cards than any previous season.

References

External links 
 Louisville City

Louisville City FC seasons
Louisville City FC
Louisville City
Louisville City